Anthony Montgomery (born March 8, 1984) is a former American football defensive tackle. He was drafted by the Washington Redskins in the fifth round of the 2006 NFL Draft. He played college football at Minnesota.

Health care fraud case
Montgomery was charged with one count of conspiracy to commit wire fraud and health care fraud, one count of wire fraud, and one count of health care fraud by the United States Department of Justice on July 24, 2020. He pleaded guilty by December 2020. By February 2022, he had been sentenced to 180 days of house arrest and ordered to perform 240 hours of community service.

References

External links
 Washington Redskins bio

1984 births
Living people
American football defensive tackles
Hartford Colonials players
Minnesota Golden Gophers football players
Washington Redskins players
Players of American football from Cleveland